Roberto Paolo Antonio Barducci (Antananarivo, 15 September 1996) is an Italian rugby union player.
His usual position is as a Prop and he currently plays for Fiamme Oro in Top10.

References 

It's Rugby England Profile
All Rugby Profile
ESPN Profile

1996 births
Living people
People from Antananarivo
Italian rugby union players
Rugby union props